Endotricha fuscobasalis is a species of snout moth in the genus Endotricha. It is found in China (Tibet) and India.

References

Moths described in 1891
Endotrichini